BBC Radio 1 Live : Steve Hillage Live in Concert  is a live album by British progressive rock musician Steve Hillage, originally recorded for the BBC at the Paris Theatre. Track 1 and 6 are from the performance at 4 December 1976 were produced by Jeff Griffin. The remaining tracks are from 28 April 1979 and produced by Chris Lycett.

Track listing 
Music and lyrics by Steve Hillage unless otherwise specified.
 	
  "Hurdy Gurdy Glissando"  (Miquette Giraudy, Steve Hillage)  − 10:59
  "Unidentified (Flying Being)" (Miquette Giraudy, Steve Hillage) − 10:16	
  "Radio" − 7:43
  "New Age Synthesis (Unzipping the Zype)" (Andy Anderson, Miquette Giraudy, Steve Hillage) − 8:30
  "Electrick Gypsies" − 4:51
  "The Salmon Song" − 7:24	
  "It's All Too Much" (George Harrison) − 6:24
  "1988 Aktivator" − 2:31
  "Crystal City" − 3:21
  "Activation Meditation" − 1:10
  "The Glorious Om Riff" (Gong) − 7:24

Personnel 
 Steve Hillage − lead guitar, vocals
 Christian Boule − guitar (tracks: 2 to 5, 7 to 11)
 Miquette Giraudy − synthesizer and backing vocals (tracks: 2 to 5, 7 to 11)
 John McKenzie − bass guitar (tracks: 2 to 5, 7 to 11)
 Andy Anderson − drums and percussion (tracks: 2 to 5, 7 to 11)

Production 
 Chris Lycett − producer (tracks: 2 to 5, 7 to 11)
 Jeff Griffin − producer (tracks: 1, 6)

Release information

References

External links
 

Steve Hillage albums
1992 albums